Admiral Duncan was launched at Shields in 1798. She traded between Britain and North American until she was burnt in 1800.

Admiral Duncan was first listed in Lloyd's Register (LR) in the issue for 1798.

Admiral Duncan, Dare, master, was destroyed by fire at New York, United States. She was on a voyage from New York to Liverpool, Lancashire.

The fire occurred on 17 January 1800 while Admiral Duncan was at the Salter Son & Co. Wharf. The fire company was unable to extinguish the blaze and they cut Admiral Duncan loose to drift out into the water. As she drifted she took several vessels with her. At some point, the brig  either was at risk or pulled her out. Eventually Admiral Duncan drifted ashore near the Battery where she was left to burn herself out.

Citations

References

1798 ships
Age of Sail merchant ships of England
Maritime incidents in 1800